Anti-Jewish riots in Tripolitania may refer to:

 1945 Anti-Jewish riots in Tripolitania
 1948 Anti-Jewish riots in Tripolitania